David Hellebuyck (born 12 May 1979) is a French former professional footballer who played as a midfielder.

Career
Born in Nantua, Hellebuyck began playing youth football with Lyon. He signed a three-year contract with Spanish club Atlético Madrid at age 17, but the transfer was rejected by FIFA before he could play for Atlético's B team. Hellebuyck eventually made his professional debut with Lyon in 1999, but his relationship with the club was strained and Guy Lacombe was able to recruit him on loan to Guingamp.

He would also play for Lausanne-Sport, Saint-Étienne, Paris Saint-Germain and Nice, making 210 Ligue 1 appearances in total. Hellebuyck ended his playing career at the end of the 2011–12 season due to a recurring knee injury.

Hellebuyck won the 1997 UEFA European Under-18 Championship with France.

References

External links
 

1979 births
Living people
People from Nantua
Sportspeople from Ain
Association football midfielders
French footballers
French expatriate footballers
French expatriate sportspeople in Switzerland
Olympique Lyonnais players
En Avant Guingamp players
FC Lausanne-Sport players
AS Saint-Étienne players
Paris Saint-Germain F.C. players
OGC Nice players
Ligue 1 players
Ligue 2 players
Swiss Super League players
Expatriate footballers in Switzerland
Footballers from Auvergne-Rhône-Alpes